The 2020/21 Moçambola is the 43nd season of Moçambola, the top-tier football league in Mozambique. The 2020/21 season started on January 16, 2021 and is in progress.

ENH changed name to Associação Desportiva Vilanculo during the season.

After the 4th round, due to the worsening of the COVID-19 pandemic in the country, the competition was stopped and postponed for three months.

The Associação Black Bulls won the 2020/21 Moçambola

Participating Clubs
Source:

Matches

Round 1
[Jan 16]

.          AD Vilankulo 4-1 CF Nacala

[Jan 17]

.           CF Maputo  0-0 UD Songo
                
Matchedje Mocuba 2-2 GD Maputo
       
.          CF Nampula  1-2 ABB
             
Incomáti Xinavane  3-0 Textáfrica
              
.                CF Beira 3-1 CD Costa do Sol
            
           LD  Maputo 1-2 CF Lichinga৳

Round 2
[Jan 23]

Desportivo Maputo       0-3 Ferroviário Maputo
      
[Jan 24]

Black Bulls             2-0 ENH Vilankulo
           
UD Songo                2-1 Liga Desportiva Maputo
  
Ferroviário Nacala      1-0 Matchedje Mocuba
        
Textáfrica              0-1 Ferroviário Nampula
     
Costa do Sol            2-1 Incomáti Xinavane
       
Ferroviário Lichinga    1-2 Ferroviário Beira

Round 3
[Jan 30]

Ferroviário Maputo      0-0 Ferroviário Nacala
      
ENH Vilankulo           3-0 Textáfrica
              
[Jan 31]

UD Songo                2-2 Desportivo Maputo
       
Matchedje Mocuba        1-2 Black Bulls
             
Ferroviário Nampula     0-1 Costa do Sol
            
Incomáti Xinavane       3-0 Ferroviário Lichinga
    
Liga Desportiva Maputo  2-1 Ferroviário Beira

Round 4
[Feb 6]

Desportivo Maputo       0-0 Liga Desportiva Maputo
  
Black Bulls             1-1 Ferroviário Maputo
      
[Feb 7]

Ferroviário Lichinga    2-0 Ferroviário Nampula
     
Ferroviário Beira       3-0 Incomáti Xinavane
       
Ferroviário Nacala      2-3 UD Songo
                
Textáfrica              1-0 Matchedje Mocuba
        
Costa do Sol            0-1 ENH Vilankulo

Round 5
[May 8]

Liga Desportiva Maputo  1-0 Incomáti Xinavane
       
Ferroviário Maputo      3-0 Textáfrica
              
Matchedje Mocuba        0-0 Costa do Sol 
           
[May 9]

UD Songo                1-4 Black Bulls
             
Desportivo Maputo       1-1 Ferroviário Nacala
      
ENH Vilankulo           2-1 Ferroviário Lichinga
    
Ferroviário Nampula     1-2 Ferroviário Beira

Round 6
[May 15]

Black Bulls             3-0 Desportivo Maputo
       
[May 16]

Costa do Sol            1-2 Ferroviário Maputo
      
Ferroviário Nacala      1-0 Liga Desportiva Maputo
  
Textáfrica              1-1 UD Songo
                
Ferroviário Lichinga    4-0 Matchedje Mocuba
        
Ferroviário Beira       3-1 ENH Vilankulo
           
Incomáti Xinavane       1-0 Ferroviário Nampula

Round 7
[May 21]

Ferroviário Maputo      1-0 Ferroviário Lichinga
    
[May 22]

UD Songo                1-0 Costa do Sol
            
Desportivo Maputo       2-1 Textáfrica
              
ENH Vilankulo           0-0 Incomáti Xinavane
       
[May 23]

Liga Desportiva Maputo  3-0 Ferroviário Nampula
     
Matchedje Mocuba        0-1 Ferroviário Beira
       
Ferroviário Nacala      0-3 Black Bulls

Round 8
[May 28]

Ferroviário Lichinga    1-0 UD Songo
                
[May 29]

Costa do Sol            2-0 Desportivo Maputo
       
[May 30]

Black Bulls             2-1 Liga Desportiva Maputo
  
Textáfrica              0-0 Ferroviário Nacala
      
Ferroviário Beira       0-1 Ferroviário Maputo
      
Incomáti Xinavane       1-1 Matchedje Mocuba
        
Ferroviário Nampula     0-0 ENH Vilankulo

Round 9
[Jun 12]

Black Bulls             4-0 Textáfrica
              
[Jun 13]

Liga Desportiva Maputo  2-2 ENH Vilankulo
           
Matchedje Mocuba        0-1 Ferroviário Nampula
     
Ferroviário Maputo      2-0 Incomáti Xinavane
       
UD Songo                0-0 Ferroviário Beira
       
Desportivo Maputo       0-2 Ferroviário Lichinga
    
Ferroviário Nacala      1-3 Costa do Sol

Round 10
[Jun 18]

Ferroviário Lichinga    2-0 Ferroviário Nacala
      
[Jun 20]

Costa do Sol            2-2 Black Bulls
             
Ferroviário Beira       1-0 Desportivo Maputo
       
Incomáti Xinavane       1-2 UD Songo
                
Ferroviário Nampula     1-0 Ferroviário Maputo
      
ENH Vilankulo           2-2 Matchedje Mocuba
        
Textáfrica              1-1 Liga Desportiva Maputo

NB: ENH changed name to Associação Desportiva Vilanculo

Round 11
[Jun 26]

Ferroviário Maputo      1-1 AD Vilankulo
            
Desportivo Maputo       1-1 Incomáti Xinavane
       
[Jun 27]

Liga Desportiva Maputo  2-1 Matchedje Mocuba
        
UD Songo                1-0 Ferroviário Nampula
     
Ferroviário Nacala      0-3 Ferroviário Beira
       
Black Bulls             4-1 Ferroviário Lichinga
    
Textáfrica              0-0 Costa do Sol

Round 12
[Jul 11]

Liga Desportiva Maputo   -  Costa do Sol
            
Ferroviário Lichinga     -  Textáfrica
              
Ferroviário Beira        -  Black Bulls
             
Incomáti Xinavane        -  Ferroviário Nacala
      
Ferroviário Nampula      -  Desportivo Maputo
       
AD Vilankulo             -  UD Songo
                
Matchedje Mocuba         -  Ferroviário Maputo

Round 13
[Jul 18]

Ferroviário Maputo  - Liga Desportiva Maputo
  
UD Songo                 -  Matchedje Mocuba
        
Desportivo Maputo        -  AD Vilankulo
            
Ferroviário Nacala       -  Ferroviário Nampula
     
Black Bulls              -  Incomáti Xinavane
       
Textáfrica               -  Ferroviário Beira
       
Costa do Sol             -  Ferroviário Lichinga

References

Moçambola
football